Granville "Granny" Liggins (born June 2, 1946 in Tulsa, Oklahoma) is a former American football and a Canadian Football League player.

College
At the University of Oklahoma, Liggins was not only a football player, but also a wrestler. In 1967, he was an NCAA Division I All-American wrestler, a Consensus All-American with the Sooners football team, where he played noseguard, 7th in Heisman Trophy voting, UPI Lineman of the Year, and an All-Big Eight Conference All-Star. He was a member of the Sooners' squad when it upset the #2 ranked Tennessee Volunteers 26-24 in the 1968 Orange Bowl.  A highlight feature of the game was nose-guard Liggins squaring off against Tennessee's All-American center Bob Johnson.  By the 2nd half of the game, Tennessee was forced to double-team Liggins in an attempt to shut-off his quarterback pass rush.

In his autobiography, Fighting Back, former Pittsburgh Steelers running back Robert "Rocky" Bleier lauded Liggins as perhaps the fastest defensive lineman Bleier had ever faced during his college career.

CFL
After his college football career, he was drafted by the Detroit Lions in 1968. However, he instead decided to go to Canada. During his football career, Granville Liggins played for the Calgary Stampeders (1968–1972) and the Toronto Argonauts (1973–1978) in the Canadian Football League. In Calgary, from 1969 to 1972, Liggins played right defensive tackle alongside left tackle John Helton, with Wayne Harris at middle linebacker, forming a very impressing middle part of a defense. He was a member of a Stampeder team that was best in the CFL in points allowed and beat the Toronto Argonauts to win the 59th Grey Cup game of 1971. Liggins made the CFL's All-Canadian Team in 1971 and 1976 and received All-Western Football Conference Honours in 1972.

During his time with the Toronto Argonauts in the mid-1970s, he was part of the team's famed "Dirty Dozen" defence, at the time the best in the CFL.  Following a trade to the Ottawa Rough Riders, Liggins retired in 1978. Perhaps the biggest barrier to a professional career with the NFL was the fact that, at 6' tall and 235 lbs, he was small for his position by NFL standards. Yet his quickness and speed made him a perfect fit at that size for the Canadian Football League. He was embraced by CFL fans in both Calgary, Alberta (he often commented that the western Canadian province reminded him of his native Oklahoma) and Toronto—and never looked back. A perennial fan favourite, Liggins was a good-natured bundle of enthusiasm, energy, skill and football smarts; as he had done in university, he made the defensive line his home and distinguished himself with a freewheeling style, quickness and cat-like agility.

Post-football
As an American football player who decided to stay in Canada after his playing career was over (later becoming a Canadian citizen), Liggins was featured on a 2004 Toronto Parks and Recreation "Contributions of African Canadians" poster created for Black History Month. Entitled "Beyond the Game", the poster featured Liggins and four other famous Toronto Argonaut players: Michael "Pinball" Clemons, Ulysses Curtis, Chuck Ealey and R. Bruce Smith.

Liggins is a member of The Pigskin Club of Washington, D.C.  National Intercollegiate All-American Football Players Honor Roll. He currently resides in Oakville, Ontario.

References

Toronto Argonauts Fact Book 1977
Oklahoma Sooners Home Page

1946 births
Living people
All-American college football players
American emigrants to Canada
Calgary Stampeders players
Canadian football defensive linemen
Canadian football offensive linemen
Naturalized citizens of Canada
Oklahoma Sooners football players
Sportspeople from Tulsa, Oklahoma
Players of American football from Oklahoma
Toronto Argonauts players